Judge Hardy and Son (1939) is the 8th film, of 16, in the Andy Hardy series. It is the last MGM film in the 1930s.

Plot summary
An older couple, the Valduzzis, (Ouspenskaya, Brecher) come to Judge Hardy (Lewis Stone) for help when they are about to be evicted from their home. He asks if their daughter can help, and they say she is dead. The Judge doesn't believe she is dead, and takes the case. Judge Hardy enlists the help of his son, Andy (Mickey Rooney), to find the couple's daughter.

Andy is having his own problems. He needs new tires, and has no money. Beezy takes his last money as repayment of a debt. He tries to borrow money from his sister, Marian, who gives him two dollars. While he tries to buy new tires, Polly Benedict finds him, and asks him to buy tickets to the dance. The tickets are more expensive than he thought, leaving him not enough money for new tires. On a ride to the courthouse, he continues to try to patch the old. He tries to get money from the Judge, but he is so overdrawn on his allowance that this isn't possible. The Judge agrees that, if Andy helps him find his client's daughter, he will get paid. Andy's tires pop again as his dad exits the car.

Andy gets to work. Taking a break at Polly's house, she wants to get romantic. All Andy wants to do is sit and have a cold drink after visiting fourteen houses in the heat—all on foot. Eventually, they go for a walk, and end up at L.V. Horton's home. Polly calls her stuck-up because she uses her initials and is a freshman. Andy dumps Polly on a hunch that L.V. Horton is who he might be looking for.

He enters the property and finds L.V. by the pool. She is a well-developed girl, who looks older than a freshman. They chat and have a soda at her own soda fountain. Andy finds out her name is Elvie and that she is writing an essay on Alexander Hamilton, which could net her a $50 prize. Her mother comes in and asks why they aren't playing. Elvie says, "We were digesting our sodas." Her mother is concerned about Andy's age. He confesses he is over 14 (whereas she is actually 18) and leaves.

Andy runs to the tire store and takes his new tires on credit- as he does on his new suit.

The ladies in the family are planning a trip to Canada to see Mrs. Hardy's family, but the Judge must remain at home and work. Andy stays to work for his father. Marian is going to lake for vacation. The Judge and Andy work and return home to find Mrs. Hardy, who didn't think they could fend for themselves. She doesn't feel well so she goes to bed. Mrs. Hardy (Fay Holden) contracts pleurisy and is in an oxygen tent.

In the meantime, Andy begins an essay on Alexander Hamilton, but finds it is only for girls. He visits several girls trying to con them into using his and giving him the $50 and they keep the glory and a 20 volume set of historical biographies. Because of his conning, Andy gets stuck with too many girls bothering him while he is trying to solve the case. Including several who think he is taking them to the dance.

Mrs. Hardy gets worse and Andy drives to get Marian. They get stuck on the opposite side of a bridge in danger of washing out. They walk with a cop to the other side and he gives them his car to get home. Their mother makes it through the crisis and gets better.

The next day, Andy visits the girls and finds that they didn't use his essay and are wildly inappropriate. He visits Elvie and finds her crying and tries to help her. She says she hates her mother. Andy is shocked but then Elvie says she didn't mean it. He asks if she could talk to her father and she says the man is her stepfather. She said she can't even write her essay. Once she is calmed he asks about Elvie using his essay.

She asks why he was asking about her name. He said it is because of his father. She said that her real name is Leonora Valduzzi Brock. He takes off to go home and hits a pot hole, losing  his tires and bumper. The Judge comes to pick him up. Andy tells him the story and the Judge takes off to talk to Leonora's mother.

He tells Mrs. Horton that the Valduzzis need money and he was hoping to find children—and children can be compelled to take care of parents. She wants to give him a check. He tells her about her own daughter. Elvie comes in and wonders why her mother is crying but is sent upstairs. Mrs. Horton said she will confess to her husband and help her parents. Part of the problem is that she told her husband she was younger than she is, and that her parents were dead. She says her daughter can stop living her lie today.

With two dates, Andy talks to his father. He wants to go with Polly, and not with the other girl. He sees no way out, and he is in debt. The Judge agrees to take care of his debts except the car until it gets fixed. He tells Andy they will have to take a bus to the fireworks and dance.

Later that day, Polly comes by, angry that Andy has two dates. She said she told the other girl to back off. Meanwhile, Elvie comes to the door looking her age. She thanks him, and tries to give him $100, which he refuses. Later, Polly and Andy show off to Mrs. Hardy before the dance. They go in Elvie's car.

Cast

 Lewis Stone as Judge James K. Hardy
 Mickey Rooney as Andy Hardy
 Cecilia Parker as Marian Hardy
 Fay Holden as Mrs. Emily Hardy
 Ann Rutherford as Polly Benedict
 Sara Haden as Aunt Mildred 'Millie' Forrest
 June Preisser  as Euphrasia 'Phrasie Daisy' Clark
 Maria Ouspenskaya as Mrs. Judith Volduzzi
 Henry Hull as Dr. Jones
 Martha O'Driscoll as Leonora V. 'Elvie' Horton
 Leona Maricle as Mrs. Maria Horton
 Margaret Early as Clarabelle V. Lee
 George Breakston as 'Beezy' Anderson
 Egon Brecher as Mr. Anton Volduzzi
 Edna Holland as Nurse Trowbridge
 Marie Blake as Augusta McBride

References

External links
 Judge Hardy and Son at IMDb
 Judge Hardy and Son at Andy Hardy Films
 
 
 

1939 films
1939 comedy films
American comedy films
American black-and-white films
Films about old age
Films directed by George B. Seitz
Metro-Goldwyn-Mayer films
1930s English-language films
1930s American films